The 1910 Tour de France was the 8th edition of Tour de France, one of cycling's Grand Tours. The Tour began in Paris on 3 July and stage 8 occurred on 15 July with a flat stage to Perpignan. The race finished in Paris on 31 July.

Stage 1
3 July 1910 — Paris to Roubaix,

Stage 2
5 July 1910 — Roubaix to Metz,

Stage 3
7 July 1910 — Metz to Belfort,

Stage 4
9 July 1910 — Belfort to Lyon,

Stage 5
11 July 1910 — Lyon to Grenoble,

Stage 6
13 July 1910 — Grenoble to Nice,

Stage 7
15 July 1910 — Nice to Nîmes,

Stage 8
17 July 1910 — Nîmes to Perpignan,

References

1910 Tour de France
Tour de France stages